Allen Edward Weh (born November 17, 1942) is an American business executive, politician, and retired colonel in the U.S. Marine Corps Reserve. He was a candidate for the Republican nomination for governor of New Mexico in the 2010 election, and the Republican Nominee for the United States Senate 2014 election against incumbent Democratic Senator Tom Udall. He is the founder and CEO of CSI Aviation Inc., the largest supplier of deportation flights for illegal immigrants in the United States, until the contract ended in 2017. Since then, the company has focused on its growing air ambulance operations in the United States.

Early life and education 
Weh was born in Salem, Oregon and grew up in North Carolina, Georgia, and New Jersey. In 1960, Weh graduated from Scotch Plains-Fanwood High School in Scotch Plains, New Jersey. He earned a Bachelor of Science degree in education and Master of Arts in counseling from the University of New Mexico.

Career
Weh began his military service as an enlisted Marine before selection for Officer Candidate School. He served two tours in Vietnam and with the British Royal Marines in Malaysia. Colonel Weh was recalled for active duty during the Persian Gulf War, for the U.S. expedition into Somalia, and to serve as chief of staff of Marine Forces Pacific prior to retiring in 1997. In 2003 and 2004. he was again recalled from the USMC Retired List to serve in Iraq and given a key leadership role with the creation and organization of the new Iraqi Army. For his service, Weh received a Silver Star, the Legion of Merit, two Bronze Star Medals, one with V device, a Purple Heart with two gold stars, the Meritorious Service medal with gold star, and five Air Medals.

In 1979, Weh and his wife, Rebecca Roberton Weh, launched CSI Aviation Services, Inc., a worldwide company that charters flights for private, commercial and government uses. In the years since, CSI has grown into a multimillion-dollar company, providing services to corporations, Department of Homeland Security and the Department of Defense, as well as medical flight services.

Weh served as chairman of the New Mexico Republican Party from 2004 to 2008.

2010 gubernatorial primary

On 1 June 2010, Weh lost to his main opponent in the primary, Dona Ana County District Attorney Susana Martinez. At the end of the election, Weh came up second with the votes, as compared to opponents Susana Martinez who took the lead, Doug Turner who came to third, Pete Domenici, Jr. in fourth, and Janice Arnold Jones who came in last. Weh conceded to Martinez shortly after 9:00 PM when Martinez held over half of the precinct votes, or 8,000 votes greater than Weh. Weh offered his congratulations to Martinez just after her decided victory". Martinez went on to win the general election.

2014 U.S. Senate election
In the 2014 election, Weh ran on the Republican ticket for United States Senate seat against the incumbent Democrat Tom Udall. In the primary he faced David Clements, also of Doña Ana County, a former assistant district attorney and chairman of the county Republican Party. In the straw poll at the Republican state convention, Clements polled a strong 47% against the well-known Weh, but in the June primary Weh beat Clements handily 63% to 37%.

In the general election Weh had the full support of the National Republican Senatorial Committee (NRSC), the National Rifle Association (NRA) and other groups who sponsored independent political advertisements. However, in October the NRSC diverted its attention and money away from New Mexico to the six states that it thought would determine control of the Senate. In the first televised debate between Udall and Weh the issues of immigration reform, job creation in New Mexico, and drought management were addressed. Weh argued Obama's policies and Udall said that he stood on his record. A second debate was scheduled at the last minute for 30 October, where issues included the national debt, Obamacare, and the economy. Weh clarified his position on the minimum wage saying, "I break with my party on this, I'm fine with raising the minimum wage." Udall won with 55.5% of the vote.

Notes

External links

|-

1942 births
Dismissal of U.S. attorneys controversy
Living people
New Mexico Republicans
Place of birth missing (living people)
Recipients of the Air Medal
Recipients of the Legion of Merit
Recipients of the Silver Star
State political party chairs of New Mexico